Lou! is a French animated comedy television series created by Julien Neel, based upon his comic book series of the same name. It was a co-production between GO-N Productions and Glénat Editions, in association with M6 and Disney Channel France. and directed by Jérôme Mouscadet. The series follows the adventures of Lou and her mother.

The series made its debut on April 5, 2009, and ran for one season with a total of 52 episodes. GO-N Productions later launched an official YouTube channel for the English-language version of the series on April 21, 2015, with more episodes to be added in 2021.

Characters
 Lou (Louise) (voiced by Emma Tate) – Lou is a 12-year-old girl who lives with her mother in an apartment. She harbors a crush on her neighbor, Tristan.
 Emma (voiced by Jules de Jongh) - Lou's mother, who at times, acts more immature than her daughter.
 Mina (voiced by Jennifer Wiltsie) – Lou's best friend since kindergarten.
 Richard (voiced by Tom Clarke-Hill)- Next-door neighbor and Emma's love interest.
 Tristan (also voiced by Jennifer Wiltsie) – A young boy with brown hair and Lou's crush.
 Joss (also voiced by Jennifer Wiltsie) – Mina's mother.
 Robert (also voiced by Tom Clarke-Hill) – Mina's father.
 Grandmother (also voiced by Jules de Jongh) – Lou's maternal grandmother.
 Gino (also voiced by Tom Clarke-Hill) – The chef of an Italian restaurant.

External links

 
 

French children's animated comedy television series
2009 French television series debuts
2010 French television series endings
Television series based on French comics
2000s French animated television series
2010s French animated television series
Animated television series about children